Pro Manager is a 1984 baseball management video game published by The Avalon Hill Game Company.  It was later published as Major League Manager by Spinnaker Software.

Gameplay
Pro Manager is a game in which the baseball team manager can get a statistical picture of any player's previous performances, compile stats of league leaders, derive standings from records, and print out all league stats.

Reception
Johnny Wilson reviewed the game for Computer Gaming World, and stated that "Major League Manager probably plays the quickest of the products reviewed in this article, but I can't help feeling that this is because you can't make as many decisions in order to affect the outcome as you can in the other games."

References

External links
Article in PC Magazine

1984 video games
Avalon Hill video games
Baseball video games
DOS games
DOS-only games
Spinnaker Software games
Sports management video games
Video games developed in the United States
Video games set in the United States